Lamadrid is a town in the northern Mexican state of Coahuila.

Lamadrid may also refer to:

 Gregorio Aráoz de Lamadrid (1795–1857), Argentine military and political leader
 General La Madrid, a town in Buenos Aires Province
 General La Madrid Partido, a partido in the central region of Buenos Aires Province
 Club Atlético General Lamadrid, a football club
 María Magdalena "Pocha" Lamadrid (1945–2021), Afro-Argentine activist